A Midsummer Night's Dream is a 1935 American romantic comedy fantasy film of William Shakespeare's play, directed by Max Reinhardt and William Dieterle, and starring James Cagney, Mickey Rooney, Olivia de Havilland, Jean Muir, Joe E. Brown, Dick Powell, Ross Alexander, Anita Louise, Victor Jory and Ian Hunter. Produced by Henry Blanke and Hal B. Wallis for Warner Brothers, and adapted by Charles Kenyon and Mary C. McCall Jr. from Reinhardt's Hollywood Bowl production of the previous year, the film is about the events surrounding the marriage of the Duke of Athens, Theseus, and the Queen of the Amazons, Hippolyta. These include the adventures of four young Athenian lovers and a group of six amateur actors, who are controlled and manipulated by the fairies who inhabit the forest in which most of the story is set. The play, which is categorized as a comedy, is one of Shakespeare's most popular works for the stage and is widely performed across the world. Felix Mendelssohn's music was extensively used, as re-orchestrated by Erich Wolfgang Korngold. The ballet sequences featuring the fairies were choreographed by Bronislava Nijinska.

Plot

Part one

A beautiful young woman named Hermia (Olivia de Havilland) is in love with Lysander (Dick Powell) and wishes to marry him. Her father Egeus (Grant Mitchell), however, has instructed her to marry Demetrius (Ross Alexander), whom he has chosen for her. When Hermia refuses to obey, stating she is in love with Lysander, her father invokes before Duke Theseus of Athens (Ian Hunter) an ancient Athenian law that states a daughter must marry the suitor chosen by her father, or face death. Theseus offers her another choice—to live a life of chastity as a nun and worship the goddess Diana.

Meanwhile, Peter Quince (Frank McHugh) and his fellow players gather to produce a stage play about the cruel death of Pyramus and Thisbe in honor of the Duke and his upcoming marriage to Hippolyta (Verree Teasdale). Quince reads the names of characters and assigns them to the players. Nick Bottom (James Cagney), who is playing the main role of Pyramus, is over-enthusiastic and suggests himself for the characters of Thisbe, the Lion, and Pyramus at the same time. He also prefers being a tyrant and recites some lines of Ercles. Quince ends the meeting instructing his players to meet at the Duke's oak tree.
 
In the forest outside Athens, Oberon (Victor Jory), the king of the fairies, and Titania (Anita Louise) his queen, are having an argument. Titania tells Oberon that she plans to stay there to attend the wedding of Duke Theseus and Hippolyta. Oberon and Titania are estranged: She refuses to give her Indian changeling to Oberon for use as his knight because the child's mother was one of Titania's worshippers. Wanting to punish Titania's disobedience, Oberon instructs his mischievous court jester Puck (Mickey Rooney) to retrieve a flower called "love-in-idleness". Originally a white flower, it turns purple when struck by Cupid's bow. When someone applies the magical love potion to a sleeping person's eyelids, it makes the victim fall in love with the first living creature seen upon awakening.

Oberon comes across a sleeping Titania and applies the love potion to her eyes. He intends to make Titania fall in love with the first creature she sees when waking up, which he is sure will be an animal of the forest. Oberon's intent is to shame Titania into giving up the little Indian changeling.

Meanwhile, Hermia and Lysander have escaped to the same forest in hopes of eloping. Demetrius, who is also in love with Hermia, pursues them into the forest. He is followed by Helena (Jean Muir), who is desperate to reclaim Demetrius' love. Helena continues to make advances toward Demetrius, promising to love him more than Hermia, but he rebuffs her with cruel insults. When Oberon sees this, he orders Puck to spread some of the love potion on the eyelids of Demetrius. When Puck later discovers the sleeping Lysander, he mistakes him for Demetrius—not having seen either before—and administers the love potion to the sleeping Lysander.

During the night, Helena comes across the sleeping Lysander and wakes him up while attempting to determine whether he is dead or asleep. When he lays eyes on her, Lysander immediately falls in love with Helena. Meanwhile, the mischievous Puck turns Bottom into a donkey (from the neck up). When Titania wakes up and lays eyes on Bottom as a donkey, she falls in love with him. Oberon finds the abandoned changeling and takes him away.

Part two

When Oberon sees Demetrius still following Hermia, he instructs Puck to bring Helena to him while he applies the love potion to the sleeping Demetrius' eyes. Upon waking up, Demetrius sees Helena, and now both Lysander and Demetrius are in love with Helena, who is convinced that her two suitors are simply mocking her. When Hermia encounters Helena with her two suitors, she accuses Helena of stealing Lysander away from her. The four quarrel with each other until Lysander and Demetrius become so enraged that they seek a place to duel each other to prove whose love for Helena is the greatest. Oberon orders Puck to keep Lysander and Demetrius from catching up with one another and to remove the charm from Lysander. After Puck applies the potion to the sleeping Lysander's eyes, he returns to loving Hermia, while Demetrius continues to love Helena. And Titania is still in love with the donkey-headed Bottom.

Oberon leads all the fairies away with the changeling at his side. Having achieved his goals, Oberon releases Titania from her spell and they leave together in love once again. Following Oberon's instructions, Puck removes the donkey's head from Bottom, and arranges everything so that Hermia, Lysander, Demetrius, and Helena all believe that they have been dreaming when they awaken. Together they return from the forest to attend the wedding of Duke Theseus and Hippolyta. When Theseus sees Hermia and her father Egeus, and seeing that Demetrius does not love Hermia any more, Theseus overrules Egeus's demands and arranges a group wedding—Hermia to marry Lysander, and Helena to marry Demetrius. The lovers decide that the previous night's events must have been a dream.

That night at the wedding, they all watch Bottom and his fellow players perform Pyramus and Thisbe. Unprepared as they are, the performers are so terrible playing their roles that the guests laugh as if it were meant to be a comedy. Before the encore, the guests sneak away and retire to bed. Afterwards, Oberon, Titania, Puck, and the other fairies enter, and bless the house and its occupants with good fortune. After everyone leaves, Puck suggests to the audience that what they just experienced might be nothing but a dream.

Cast

The Athenian Court
 Ian Hunter as Theseus, Duke of Athens
 Verree Teasdale as Hippolyta, Queen of the Amazons, betrothed to Theseus
 Hobart Cavanaugh as Philostrate, Master of Revels to Theseus
 Dick Powell as Lysander, In love with Hermia
 Ross Alexander as Demetrius, In love with Hermia
 Olivia de Havilland as Hermia, In love with Lysander
 Jean Muir as Helena, In love with Demetrius
 Grant Mitchell as Egeus, Father to Hermia

The Players
 Frank McHugh as Quince, the Carpenter
 Dewey Robinson as Snug, the Joiner
 James Cagney as Bottom, the Weaver
 Joe E. Brown as Flute, the Bellows-mender
 Hugh Herbert as Snout, the Tinker
 Otis Harlan as Starveling, the Tailor
 Arthur Treacher as Epilogue

The Fairies
 Victor Jory as Oberon, King of the Fairies
 Anita Louise as Titania, Queen of the Fairies Carol Ellis: singing voice
 Nini Theilade as Fairie, Attending Titania (as Nina Theilade)
 Mickey Rooney as Puck or Robin Goodfellow, a Fairy
 Katherine Frey as Pease-Blossom
 Helen Westcott as Cobweb
 Fred Sale as Moth
 Billy Barty as Mustard-Seed
 Peggy Lynch (Margaret Kerry) as a fairy

Casting notes:
Many of the actors in this version never had performed Shakespeare and would not do so again, especially Cagney and Brown, who were nevertheless highly acclaimed for their performances. Many critics agreed that Dick Powell was miscast as Lysander, and Powell concurred with the critics' verdict. 
Olivia de Havilland originally played the role of Hermia in Max Reinhardt's Hollywood Bowl stage production of the play. Although the cast of the stage play was mostly replaced by Warner Brothers contract players, de Havilland and Mickey Rooney were chosen to reprise their original roles.

Avant-garde director Kenneth Anger claimed in his book Hollywood Babylon II to have played the changeling prince in this film when he was a child, but in fact the role was played by child actress Sheila Brown.

Production

Austrian-born director Max Reinhardt did not speak English at the time of the film's production. He gave orders to the actors and crew in German with William Dieterle acting as his interpreter. The film was banned in Nazi Germany because of the Jewish backgrounds of Reinhardt and composer Felix Mendelssohn and music arranger and conductor Erich Wolfgang Korngold.

The shooting schedule had to be rearranged after Mickey Rooney broke his leg while tobogganing at Big Pines, California. Since the production was too expensive to be delayed, Rooney's remaining scenes had to be shot with a stand-in, George Breakston, for the running and elfin sequences. Foliage had to be used to conceal his broken leg, as well as holes in the floor to complete Rooney's scenes. According to Rooney's memoirs, Jack L. Warner was furious and threatened to kill him and then break his other leg.

This was the film debut of Olivia de Havilland.

Release and distribution

Cancellations
At the time, cinemas entered into a contract to show the film, but had the right to pull out within a specified period of time. Cancellations usually ran between 20 and 50. The film established a new record with 2,971 cancellations. Booking agents had failed to correctly identify the film.

Run times
The film was first released at 132 minutes, but was edited to 117 minutes for its general release run. The full 132 minute version was not seen again until it was shown on cable television in 1994. The film was then re-issued at its full length on VHS (its first video release was of the edited version). Later showings on Turner Classic Movies have restored the film's pre-credits Overture, and its Exit Music, neither of which had been heard since its 1935 road show presentations. In August 2007, it was released on DVD for the first time, both individually and as part of a box set known as The Shakespeare Collection.

Critical response
The film failed at the box office and received mixed reviews, with the cinematography, the use of Mendelssohn's music, and the dance sequences being highly praised. Although James Cagney was acclaimed for his performance, Warner Bros. was criticized by film critic Richard Watts, Jr. for "weakening" enough to cast an actor "whose performance is not much short of fatal", referring to box-office favorite Dick Powell, then in his "Hollywood crooner" phase, who reportedly realized he was completely wrong for the role of Lysander and asked to be taken off the film, to no avail.

The reviewer for Variety wrote of the film: "Question of whether a Shakespearean play can be successfully produced on a lavish scale for the films is affirmatively answered by this commendable effort. (...) The fantasy, the ballets of the Oberon and Titania cohorts, and the characters in the eerie sequences are convincing and illusion compelling. Film is replete with enchanting scenes, beautifully photographed and charmingly presented. All Shakespearian devotees will be pleased at the soothing treatment given to the Mendelssohn score. (...) The women are uniformly better than the men. They get more from their lines. The selection of Dick Powell to play Lysander was unfortunate. He never seems to catch the spirit of the play or role. And Mickey Rooney, as Puck, is so intent on being cute that he becomes almost annoying. There are some outstanding performances, however, notably Victor Jory as Oberon. His clear, distinct diction indicates what can be done by careful recitation and good recording; Olivia de Havilland, as Hermia, is a fine artist here; others are Jean Muir, Verree Teasdale and Anita Louise, the latter beautiful as Titania but occasionally indistinct in her lines."

In The New York Times, Andre Sennwald wrote that the film was "no masterpiece" but a "brave, beautiful and interesting effort" with "magical moments when it all comes alive," praising its "high ambitions and unflagging interest... a credit to Warner Brothers and the motion picture industry." He praised Korngold's "magnificent" score and Dieterle's direction as "enormously skillful in executing a narrative counterpoint for the four distinct situations," but was critical of the ballets, the goblins, and the "clever mechanical tricks" such as the visible wire suspending Puck in space." Sennwald also praised the clowns, writing that Brown's was "the best performance in the show" and calling Herbert and McHugh "uproarious." Rooney's "remarkable" puck was "one of the major delights of the work," but Cagney was "too dynamic" to play the "dullard" Bottom, and the "earnest sobriety" of Jory's Oberon "scarcely seems appropriate" to the "antic" fairy king.

Writing for The Spectator in 1935, Graham Greene discussed the mixed contemporary reviews of the film and claimed for himself that he had enjoyed the film - something Greene speculated might be attributed to his lack of affection for the play. He characterized the acting as "fresh and vivid" due to its lack of "proper Shakespearian diction and bearing"; however, he criticized the film's direction, noting that Reinhardt seemed "uncertain of his new medium" and that "much of the production is poised [...] on the edge of absurdity because Herr Reinhardt cannot visualize how his ideas will work out on the screen".

Today, the film gets mostly good reviews. Emanuel Levy writes: "Bold and impressive, Reinhardt's screen version of his famous Hollywood Bowl Shakespearean production was nominated for the Best Picture Oscar." , Reinhardt's A Midsummer Night's Dream  holds a 91% rating on Rotten Tomatoes, based on 8 reviews.

Awards and honors
The film won two Academy Awards: 
 Best Cinematography - Hal Mohr
 Best Film Editing - Ralph Dawson

It was nominated for: 
 Best Picture - Henry Blanke, producer
 Best Assistant Director - Sherry Shourds

Hal Mohr was not nominated for his work on the movie; he won the Oscar thanks to a grass-roots write-in campaign. It was Mohr who decided that the trees should be sprayed with orange paint, giving them the eerie glow which added to the "fairyland" effect in the film. The next year, the Academy of Motion Picture Arts and Sciences declared that it would no longer accept write-in votes for the awards.

Music
Felix Mendelssohn's music was used, but re-orchestrated by Erich Wolfgang Korngold. Not all of it was from the incidental music that Mendelssohn had composed for A Midsummer Night's Dream in 1843. Other pieces used were excerpts from the Symphony No. 3 Scottish, the Symphony No. 4 Italian, and the Songs without Words, among others.

Shakespeare in Hollywood
Originally commissioned by the Royal Shakespeare Company, American playwright Ken Ludwig's play, Shakespeare in Hollywood, had its world premiere in September 2004 at Arena Stage in Washington, D.C. It won the Helen Hayes Award for Best New Play. Oberon and Puck are magically transported to 1934 Hollywood and become embroiled—and cast—in the troubled production of this film. "Real" characters in the cast include Jack Warner, Max Reinhardt, Will Hays, Joe E. Brown and Jimmy Cagney.  "When the enchantment of the silver screen meets the magic of Fairyland, all merry hell breaks loose, and we are treated to transformations, chase scenes, and the kind of havoc that only that certain love-juice can wreak. Shakespeare in Hollywood is a supernatural screwball romp, full of entertainment, and even a little bit of education."

References

External links

 
 
 
 
 

1935 films
1935 romantic comedy films
1930s fantasy comedy films
American black-and-white films
1930s English-language films
American fantasy comedy films
Films based on A Midsummer Night's Dream
Films set in Greece
Films directed by Max Reinhardt
Films directed by William Dieterle
Films scored by Erich Wolfgang Korngold
Films whose cinematographer won the Best Cinematography Academy Award
Films whose editor won the Best Film Editing Academy Award
Warner Bros. films
1930s American films